Ever So Shy is the second General Fiasco single to be released through Infectious Records, from the debut album, Buildings. It was released as an EP on 14 March as a digital download through iTunes, and was then also released as a single on 15 March. It reached no.77 on the UK Charts, it is General Fiasco's best-selling single to date.

It was featured in the end credits of Episode 5, Home Alone, from The Inbetweeners Series 3. The song also appeared during an episode of the TV show Jersey Shore, with emphasis on the lyrics, "let's get wasted, it's all we ever do".

Music video
The video for the song was directed by Adam Neustadter and was shot in New York. The video was first released on YouTube for free streaming on 8 February 2010 and was later released on the EP.

Track listing

References

External links
Ever So Shy - EP at iTunes
Ever So Shy Music Video on YouTube.com

General Fiasco songs
2010 singles
2010 songs
Infectious Records singles
Song articles with missing songwriters